Konaté or Konate is a surname. Notable people with the surname include:

Abdoulaye Konaté (born 1953), Malian artist
Ben Konaté (born 1986), Ivorian-born Equatoguinean football player
Djibril Konaté (born 1980), Malian football player
Famoudou Konaté, Malinké drummer from Guinea
Hamadou Konaté, Malian politician
Ibrahima Konaté, French football player
Kadiatou Konaté, Malian director and screenwriter
Losseni Konaté (born 1972), Ivorian football player
Madiou Konate (born 1982), Senegalese football player
Mamadou Konaté (1897–1956), Malian politician
Mamadou Konate (footballer) (born 1985), Ivorian football player
Moussa Konaté (born 1951–2013), Malian writer
Moussa Konaté (kickboxer), French Muay Thai kickboxer
Naré Maghann Konaté (died 1218), 12th-century king of the Mandinka people, in what is today Mali
Pape Moussa Konaté (born 1993), Senegalese football player
 Pa Konate, Swedish Football player of Senegalese descent
Sagaba Konate (born 1997), Malian basketball player
Sékouba Konaté (born 1964), officer of the Guinean army, formerly Vice President of its military junta
Souleimane Konate (born 1984), French heavyweight kickboxer and martial artist
Tiémoko Konaté (born 1990), Ivorian football player
Yacouba Konaté (born 1953), Ivorian curator, writer, art critic, and professor

See also
Konaty
Kownatka
Kownaty (disambiguation)